Kuh or KUH may refer to:

Places 
Kuh, Iran, a village in South Khorasan Province, Iran
Kuh-e Olya, a village in Hormozgan Province, Iran
Kuh-e Sofla, a village in Hormozgan Province, Iran
Kushiro Airport, Hokkaidō, Japan, IATA code
 Kuh (mountain), common in Iranian place names; see Special:Allpages/Kuh.
 Kuh, Chitral,  Union Council of Chitral District, Pakistan

People 
 Brian Kuh, American competitive gamer
 Ephraim Kuh, (1731-1790), German-Jewsoh author
 Gertrude Kuh (1893–1977), American landscape architect
 Katharine Kuh (1904–1994), American art historian, curator and critic
 Kuh Ledesma (born 1955), Filipino singer

Other uses 
 Kuopio University Hospital, a central hospital in Kuopio, Finland
 Kushi language, a language of Nigeria

German toponymic surnames
Jewish surnames